Sir John Lyster Kaye, 4th Baronet  (1697–1752) of Denby Grange, Kirkheaton, Yorkshire, was a British landowner and Tory politician who sat in the House of Commons from 1734 to 1741.

Kaye was baptised at Almondbury, on  4 September 1697, the eldest son of George Kaye of Denby Grange, Kirkheaton, Yorkshire, and his wife Dorothy Savile, daughter of Robert Savile of Bryan Royd, near Elland, Yorkshire. He matriculated at Christ Church, Oxford on  24 May 1715, aged 18. He married Ellen Wilkinson, daughter of John Wilkinson of Greenhead, near  Huddersfield. He succeeded his  uncle Sir Arthur Kaye, Bt  to the baronetcy on 10 July 1726. His wife Ellen died on  29 January 1729. He married Dorothy Richardson, daughter of Richard Richardson, MD of North Bierley, Yorkshire as his second wife on 29 July 1730. 
 
He was  invited by the local Tories to stand for York at the 1734 British general election, and was returned as Member of Parliament without a contest. He voted against the Government. In 1735, he became an Alderman of York and in 1737 became Lord Mayor of York. He was defeated at the 1741 British general election. In 1742, he was invited to stand again for York at a by-election, but decided not to because of his health. He recommended instead George Fox, who was elected.  
 
Kaye succeeded  to estates of his uncle Thomas Lister (formerly Kaye) of Thornton-in-Craven, Yorkshire in 1745, taking in addition the  name of Lister before Kaye.  He died on 5 April  1752 and was buried at Flockton.

He had one son John by his first wife Ellen, who succeeded to the baronetcy, and four sons by his second wife Dorothy.

References

1697 births
1752 deaths
British MPs 1734–1741
Members of the Parliament of Great Britain for English constituencies
Baronets in the Baronetage of England